The Musée Toulouse-Lautrec is an art museum in Albi, southern France, dedicated mainly to the work of the painter Henri de Toulouse-Lautrec who was born in Albi. The 13th century building was originally the Bishop's Palace of Albi Cathedral, next to it. It is part of the UNESCO World Heritage Site that includes the cathedral.

The Bishop's Palace 
The Bishop's Palace, or Palais épiscopal de la Berbi, was originally the residence of the bishop of Albi Cathedral, located next to the museum.  It is included in the same UNESCO historical site as the cathedral. The Bishop's palace was begun before the Cathedral itself, by Bishop Durand de Beaucaire (bishop from 1228–1254). It was built with the features of a fortress during the period when the Catholic Church was at war with the a heretical sect called the Cathars, which originated in Albi. 

Bishop de Combret, the next resident, further fortified his palace by connecting it to the Cathedral tower, twenty-five meters away.  He added bastions and a  machicoulis over the entrance, to drop heavy objects or boiling water on any attackers. The next owner, Bishop De Castanet, built a new wall around it and added Saint Catherine tower, which he linked to one of the towers of the cathedral.

Later Bishops modified the palace by adding a new residence, a chapel and a French-style garden. and filled the interior with mosaics and art. In 1905, when the Cathedral and its properties were officially nationalised, and the Palace was given to the city of Albi for use as a museum.

The Toulouse-Lautrec Museum 
In 1922 the museum received an important collection of works by Henri de Toulouse-Lautrec, donated by his mother.  The collection includes his last painting, Examination at the School of Medicine, from 1901. 

The museum houses over a thousand works by and about Toulouse-Lautrec. It is based on a donation by Toulouse-Lautrec's mother after his death in 1901.

See also
 List of single-artist museums

References

Bibliography

External links

Art museums and galleries in France
Biographical museums in France
Museums in Tarn (department)
Museums devoted to one artist
Art museums established in 1922
Musee Toulouse-Lautrec
Henri de Toulouse-Lautrec